The Harvard Exit Theatre was a cinema located in Seattle, Washington. It was housed in a building built in 1925 by the Woman's Century Club, which still meets there at midday on the third Friday of the month. The building was sold in 1968 on the condition that the lobby not be altered, which it has not been to this day. In that same year it was converted into a cinema by Jim Osteen and Art Bernstein, and reports began to surface that the building was haunted by a woman in 1920s garb. However, reports ceased in 1987. The theatre was owned by O'Steen & Harvard Investments and operated by Landmark Theaters   until 2015, when developer Scott Shapiro purchased the building for conversion to an office and restaurant space. The Consulate of Mexico planned to move into leased space in the building, and the consulate opened circa July 2018.

References

External links
Landmark Theatres website
Woman's Century Club website

Capitol Hill, Seattle
Cinemas and movie theaters in Washington (state)
Culture of Seattle
Paranormal
Reportedly haunted locations in Washington (state)